Becky Jane Hutchins (born September 3, 1949) is an American politician. She has served as a Republican member for the 61st district in the Kansas House of Representatives since 2015. She was given an evaluation of 60% by the American Conservative Union in 2015 and an evaluation of 92% in 2016, for a lifetime evaluation of 76%. She previously served in the House from 1994 to 2006.

References

1949 births
Living people
People from Holton, Kansas
Women state legislators in Kansas
Republican Party members of the Kansas House of Representatives
21st-century American politicians
21st-century American women politicians
20th-century American women politicians
20th-century American politicians